Ricardo Zacarías Ortíz (born August 31, 1995) is an American professional soccer player who plays as a forward for USL Championship club El Paso Locomotive.

Career 
Zacarías played a season in the USL PDL with his local side Albuquerque Sol in 2015.

Following a Sueno Alianza open tryout in Mexico in September 2015, where Zacarías competed with over 700 other players, Zacarías caught the attention of scouts in Liga MX. He was later invited back to attend another showcase in Miami, Florida. From this trial, he earned a contract with Liga MX powerhouse Club América.

Zacarías spent five years in Mexico, playing with Club América Premier, Irapuato, Coras de Nayarit and La Piedad.

On January 30, 2020, signed with USL League One side Chattanooga Red Wolves.

On May 19, 2021, Zacarías joined USL Championship side El Paso Locomotive.

References

External links
 
 

1995 births
Living people
American soccer players
American expatriate soccer players
Association football forwards
Coras de Nayarit F.C. footballers
Irapuato F.C. footballers
Chattanooga Red Wolves SC players
El Paso Locomotive FC players
Soccer players from New Mexico
USL League One players
Liga Premier de México players
Sportspeople from Las Cruces, New Mexico
American sportspeople of Mexican descent